The 2011 Prime Minister's Cup was the sixth national football cup competition in Laos. The competition was won by Bank FC, who beat Police FC 2-1 in the final.

Format
The top four teams from the 2010 Lao League competed in a single group round robin stage from which the top two teams competed in a one-legged final. This was the first season where full records exist that there was no representation from any of the regional teams.

Group stage

Results

Round 1

Round 2

Round 3

Final

References

2011 domestic association football cups
Football competitions in Laos
Lao Premier League
Prime Minister's Cup
2011 in Laotian football